Mecca Township is one of the twenty-four townships of Trumbull County, Ohio, United States.  The 2000 census found 2,829 people in the township.

Geography
Located in the northern part of the county, it borders the following townships:
Greene Township - north
Gustavus Township - northeast corner
Johnston Township - east
Fowler Township - southeast corner
Bazetta Township - south
Champion Township - southwest corner
Bristol Township - west
Bloomfield Township - northwest corner

No municipalities are located in Mecca Township.

Name and history
Mecca Township was established in 1821.  The township derives its name from Mecca, in Saudi Arabia. It is the only Mecca Township statewide.

The history of drilling for oil in southwestern Mecca Township, beginning in the 1860s, was recorded in an article in a postal history magazine in 2000. The article was illustrated by maps of the area, by an envelope mailed from the Oil Diggins post office in May 1866, and by a photograph of the "Diggins" restaurant in West Mecca, stated to be "the only building standing as a reminder of the town of Oil Diggins".

Government
The township is governed by a three-member board of trustees, who are elected in November of odd-numbered years to a four-year term beginning on the following January 1. Two are elected in the year after the presidential election and one is elected in the year before it. There is also an elected township fiscal officer, who serves a four-year term beginning on April 1 of the year after the election, which is held in November of the year before the presidential election. Vacancies in the fiscal officership or on the board of trustees are filled by the remaining trustees.

References

External links
County website

Townships in Trumbull County, Ohio
1821 establishments in Ohio
Populated places established in 1821
Townships in Ohio